Sur is one of the central districts of Diyarbakır Province in Turkey. It is a historic place situated inside the Diyarbakır Fortress. The district takes its name from the castle walls.

Background
Sur district was founded in Diyarbakır Province in 2008 as the central historic settlement. Many historic buildings and structures in the district are witness of several civilizations and rich cultures, which were hosted in the location in the history.

The background of Sur goes back to 7500 BC. Archaeological excavations showed that world's oldest settlement was located in the region. Civilizations ruled here are Hurrians (Bronze Age), Mitanni (c. 1500 BC–c. 1300 BC), Hittites (c. 1600 BC–c. 1178 BC), Assur (early Bronze Age), Persians (early 10th century BC), Alexander the Great (356 BC – 323 BC), Roman Empire, Byzantine Empire, Marwanids, Ayyubid Empire and Ottoman Empire.

Politics 
The current Mayor is Feyme Filiz Buluttekin. As Kaymakan was appointed Abdullah Çiftçi.

Visitor attractions
Sur is a historic and cultural  center. It features historic Diyarbakır houses, Diyarbakır Archaeological Museum, Cahit Sıtkı Tarancı Museum, East Syriac Rite St. Mary's Cathedral, Syriac Orthodox St. Mary Church, St. Giragos Armenian Church, Dicle Bridge, Deliler Inn, Hasan Pasha Inn, Hazreti Süleyman Mosque containing graves of 27 companions of Muhammad, Nebi Mosque, Sheikh Matar Mosque and its Four-legged Minaret, Great Mosque of Diyarbakır and Diyarbakır Fortress as well as caravanserais, madrasas, shadirvans and inscriptions of various historic periods.

2015 conflict and rebuilding of the district
In 2015, militants linked to the banned Kurdistan Workers' Party (PKK) entered Sur district, erected barricades and dug ditches in the streets. The local authority banned public gatherings and imposed a 24h curfew in Sur on the 11 December 2015, and the Turkish Army deployed about 200 troops of the Special Forces Command to conduct house-to-house searches. The conflict resulted in most residents abandoning their homes. Abandoned houses in various neighborhoods of Sur district were occupied by militants, and clashes between the PKK and Turkish Army and Special Forces continued until early 2016. 

Amnesty International has estimated that 300,000 people were displaced by the conflict, and branded the government's response 'collective punishment'. International Crisis Group has estimated that around 1,700 people have been killed in the resulting conflict and estimates the number of displaced people at 350,000. Human Rights Watch criticized the Turkish government for 'blocking access for independent investigations into alleged mass abuses against civilians across southeast Turkey'.

Many houses were destroyed and registered historic buildings were seriously damaged. In March 2016, the government launched a project for the restoration of all the damaged historic structures and the rebuilding of destroyed houses in accordance of their original style. However, the project was criticized by the Turkish Union of Architects and Engineers Chambers, who claimed that the project would take “a defense-centered approach”, which would require the destruction of some historic structures.

References

 
Populated places in Diyarbakır Province
2008 establishments in Turkey
States and territories established in 2008
Kurdish settlements in Turkey